is a private university in Tondabayashi, Osaka, Japan. The school was established in 1966 as a junior women's college. In 2006 it became coeducational, adopting the present name.

External links
 Official website 

Buddhist universities and colleges in Japan
Educational institutions established in 1966
Private universities and colleges in Japan
Universities and colleges in Osaka Prefecture
1966 establishments in Japan
Tondabayashi, Osaka